The Battle of the Bricks is the name given to the Miami–Ohio football rivalry. It is a college football rivalry between the Miami RedHawks and the Ohio Bobcats. Both schools are members of the Mid-American Conference. The two teams have met 98 times on the football field, with Miami currently holding a 54–42–2 edge in the all-time series. Ohio University players and staff receive a mug with game information for each rivalry win over Miami (OH) football.

Game results

See also  
 List of NCAA college football rivalry games

References

College football rivalries in the United States
Miami RedHawks football
Ohio Bobcats football
1908 establishments in Ohio